S. ehrenbergii may refer to:

 Sansevieria ehrenbergii, a northeastern African plant
 Saropogon ehrenbergii, a robber fly
 Solanum ehrenbergii, a tuberous plant
 Stachys ehrenbergii, a lamb's ear

See also

 S. ehrenbergi (disambiguation)